Taşçılar can refer to the following villages in Turkey:

 Taşçılar, Bayburt
 Taşçılar, Bilecik
 Taşçılar, Bolu
 Taşçılar, Çameli
 Taşçılar, Mudurnu
 Taşçılar, Taşköprü